Emmen Bargeres is a former railway station located in Emmen, Netherlands. It was open from 1 June 1975 until 3 April 2011 and was located on the Emmerlijn (Zwolle - Emmen). The station was operated by Nederlandse Spoorwegen. The station was  replaced by Emmen Zuid railway station, at another location on the same line.

The station was elevated over a single track bridge over the N391 road.

See also
 List of railway stations in Drenthe

Railway stations in Drenthe
Railway stations opened in 1975
Railway stations closed in 2010
Railway stations on the Emmerlijn
Buildings and structures in Emmen, Netherlands